Xylocoris californicus is a species of bugs in the family Lyctocoridae. It is found in North America.

References

Further reading

 
 
 

Lyctocoridae
Insects described in 1884